The Orchestra Sinfonica di Milano Giuseppe Verdi (Symphony Orchestra of Milan Giuseppe Verdi) is an Italian orchestra based in Milan.  The orchestra refers to itself as La Verdi colloquially.  The orchestra's primary residence is the Auditorium di Milano Fondazione Cariplo.

History
Vladimir Delman founded the orchestra in 1993 as an independent, self-governing organisation. In 1998, a choir affiliated with the orchestra was established, the Coro Sinfonico Giuseppe Verdi di Milano.

In 2002, the orchestra was resident at the Spoleto Festival dei Due Mondi, and played in France, Spain, Portugal and Switzerland in its first European tour.  In 2004, the orchestra became the resident orchestra at the Festival delle Nazioni of Città di Castello.  The orchestra has toured throughout Italy, such as in the autumn of 2006.  On 24 April 2008, the orchestra also performed for Pope Benedict XVI and President of the Italian Republic Giorgio Napolitano for the third anniversary of Benedict XVI's Pontificate. In 2008 the Orchestra also took part on Opera Gala "World Stars" performing operas’ arias by Verdi and Puccini.

Conductors
The orchestra's first music director was Riccardo Chailly, from 1999 to 2005.  Chailly now has the title of Conductor Laureate.  Rudolf Barshai was named conductor laureate in 2006.  Principal guest conductors have included Helmuth Rilling and Wayne Marshall.  Claus Peter Flor became principal guest conductor in 2003.

In March 2009, the orchestra announced the appointment of Xian Zhang as its next music director, the first woman to be named music director of an Italian symphony orchestra.  She held the post until 2016, and now has the title of Direttore Emerita (conductor emeritus) with the orchestra.  In June 2017, the orchestra announced the appointment of Flor as its next music director, effective with the 2017-2018 season, with an initial contract of 3 years.

Recordings
 2000 - Giuseppe Verdi: Heroines, Conductor Riccardo Chailly, (Decca, DDD)
 2000 - Giuseppe Verdi: Messa Solenne, Conductor Riccardo Chailly, (Decca, DDD 00289 467 2802)
 2001 - Cinema Italiano (with Lucio Dalla, Deborah Harry, Filippa Giordano, Luciano Pavarotti and Sting), Conductor Luis Bacalov, (Decca, 467 050-2)
 2002 - Sacred Song, with Plácido Domingo, Conductor Marcello Viotti, (Deutsche Grammophon, DDD)
 2003 - Dmitri Shostakovich: Symphonies Nos. 5 & 6, Conductor Oleg Caetani, (ARTS music)
 2003 - Bruno Maderna: Grande Aulodia, Conductor Sandro Gorli, (Stradivarius, DDD)
 2003 - Bruno Maderna: Liriche su Verlaine, Conductor Sandro Gorli (Stradivarius, DDD)
 2003 - Theater Brass at Cinecittà, David Short, Ensemble di ottoni e di percussioni dell'Orchestra Sinfonica di Milano Giuseppe Verdi, (Beat Records)
 2003 - Nino Rota: Lo scoiattolo, Erna Collaku, Francesco Palmieri, Luciano Miotto, Conductor Giuseppe Grazioli (La bottega discantica, DDD)
 2003 - Puccini: Integrale per quartetto d'archi (DECCA, DDD)
 2003 - Shostakovich: Symphony No. 7, Conductor Oleg Caetani,  (ARTS music)
 2003 - Una furtiva lagrima, Juan Diego Flórez, Conductor Riccardo Frizza (Decca, DDD 00289 473 4402)
 2003 - Rossini Arias, Juan Diego Flórez, Conductor Riccardo Chailly (Decca, DDD 00289 470 0242 )
 2003 - Verdi Discoveries, Conductor Riccardo Chailly (DECCA, DDD 00289 473 7672)
 2003 - Rossini Discoveries, Laura Giordano, Ildar Abdrazakov, Michele Pertusi, Conductor Riccardo Chailly (Decca, DDD)
 2003 - Puccini Discoveries, Taigi, Calleja, Mastromarino, Urbanova, Volonté, Conductor Riccardo Chailly (Decca, DDD 00289 475 3202)
 2004 - Ramón Vargas, Between Friends, conductor Vjekoslav Sutej, (RCA)
 2004 - Joseph Calleja, Tenor Arias, conductor Riccardo Chailly (Decca, DDD 00289 470 6482)
 2004 - Sempre libera, Anna Netrebko, conductor Claudio Abbado (DG)
 2004 - Shostakovich: Symphonies Nos. 9 & 10, Conductor Oleg Caetani (ARTS music)
 2004 - Shostakovich: Symphony No. 4, conductor Oleg Caetani (ARTS music)
 2004 - Great Tenor Arias, Juan Diego Flórez, conductor Carlo Rizzi (Decca, DDD 00289 475 5502)
 2004 – Puccini, Arie, Conductor Anton Coppola (EMI Classics)
 2004 – Luciano Berio, Orchestral transcriptions, Conductor Riccardo Chailly (Decca, DDD 00289 476 2830)
 2005 – Shostakovich: Symphony No. 8, conductor Oleg Caetani (ARTS music)
 2005 – Shostakovich: Symphony No. 11, conductor Oleg Caetani  (ARTS music)
 2006 – Shostakovich, Chamber Symphonies Nos. 1-5, conductor Rudolf Barshai (Brilliant Classics, EAN Code 5029365821223)
 2006 – Forbidden Love, conductor Roberto Rizzi Brignoli (Sony Classical)
 2006 – Shostakovich: Symphonies Nos. 2 & 12, conductor Oleg Caetani (ARTS music)
 2006 – Shostakovich: Symphony No. 13 ("Babi Yar"), Orchestra Sinfonica e Coro Sinfonico di Milano Giuseppe Verdi, Conductor Oleg Caetani (ARTS music)
 2006 - Shostakovich: Symphonies Nos. 1, 10 & 15, conductor Oleg Caetani (ARTS music)
 2006 - Shostakovich: Symphonies Nos. 3 & 14, conductor Oleg Caetani (ARTS music)
 2006 - Shostakovich: Complete Symphonies, conductor Oleg Caetani (ARTS music)
 2008 - Umberto Giordano: Andrea Chénier, conductor Vjekoslav Sutej. (Universal DDD)
 2008 - "Cielo e mar", Conductor Daniele Callegari, (Deutsche Grammophon, 477 7224)
 2008 - Paul Hindemith, La Storia di Tuttifäntchen (Christmas fable), Conductor Fabrizio Dorsi (La Bottega Discantica)
 2008 - Verdissimo Arias by Giuseppe Verdi,  conductor Oleg Caetani (Warner Music)
 2008 - Andrea Bocelli, Incanto, conductor Steven Mercurio (Sugar Music)

Record awards
 2000: Giuseppe Verdi - Heroines (conductor, Riccardo Chailly; Decca), Gramophone Award, Classic FM People's Choice, Le Choc de l'Année
 2006: Shostakovich, Complete Symphonies (conductor, Oleg Caetani; Arts), 10/10 Highest Rating - Classics Today, il ffff – Télérama awards

Music directors
 Riccardo Chailly (1999-2005)
 Xian Zhang (2009-2016)
 Claus Peter Flor (2017–present)

References

External links
 Official website of the Orchestra Sinfonica di Milano Giuseppe Verdi

Italian orchestras
Musical groups established in 1993
Music in Milan
Giuseppe Verdi
1993 establishments in Italy
Musical groups from Milan